Barzyna refers to the following places in Poland:

 Barzyna, Opole Voivodeship
 Barzyna, Warmian-Masurian Voivodeship